Place-d'Armes station is a Montreal Metro station in the borough of Ville-Marie in Montreal, Quebec, Canada. It is operated by the Société de transport de Montréal (STM) and serves the Orange Line. It is located in Old Montreal.

The station opened on October 14, 1966, as part of the original network of the Metro. It was briefly the terminus of the Orange Line until Square-Victoria-OACI station opened four months later, quickly followed by Bonaventure station, the planned terminus.

Overview

The station, designed by Janusz Warunkiewicz, is a normal side platform station, built in open cut due to the presence of weak Utica shale in the surrounding rock. Its mezzanine, with fare barriers at either side, is located directly under the Palais des congrès de Montréal; one end gives direct access to the Palais, while the other opens outside, near Chinatown.

Station improvements
In March 2017, the station was made accessible with the installation of elevators. The station is equipped with the MétroVision information screens which displays news, commercials, and the time until the next train arrives.

Origin of the name

This station is named for the Place d'Armes, a short distance to the south. It is the third square in Montreal to have this name, which is the common French name for the rallying place for a fort's defenders. It contains a statue of Paul Chomedey, sieur de Maisonneuve.

Connecting bus routes

Station closure
Place d’Armes station was closed from December 1 to December 21, 2022, due to the COP15 conference; the authorities requested a complete closure of the station. The 55, 129, 361, 363 and 365 bus lines were rerouted to not stop at the station.

Nearby points of interest

Connected via the underground city

Palais des congrès de Montréal
Complexe Guy-Favreau (Government of Canada)
Square-Victoria-OACI Metro station and points west
Place-des-Arts Metro station and points north

Other

500 Place D'Armes - AMT Headquarters
Bank of Montreal Head Office complex
Centaur Theatre
Chinatown
La Presse
Notre-Dame Basilica
Old Brewery Mission
Old Montreal
Old Port
 Montreal Science Centre
Palais de justice de Montréal
Musée Pointe-à-Callière

References

External links

Place-d'Armes Station - official site
Montreal by Metro, metrodemontreal.com - photos, information, and trivia
 2011 STM system map
 2011 Downtown System Map
 Metro Map

Accessible Montreal Metro stations
Old Montreal
Downtown Montreal
Orange Line (Montreal Metro)
Railway stations in Canada opened in 1966